The 1928–29 Divizia A was the seventeenth season of Divizia A, the top-level football league of Romania.

Participating teams

Final Tournament of Regions

Preliminary round

Quarters

Semifinals

Final
September 14, 1929, Bucharest

Champion squad

References

Liga I seasons
Romania
1928–29 in Romanian football